Oreodera fasciculosa is a species of beetle in the family Cerambycidae. It was described by Thomson in 1865.

It can be found on neotropical regions like Chiapas and Veracruz in Mexico.

References

Oreodera
Beetles described in 1865